A Christmas Tale is a 2008 French comedy-drama film by Arnaud Desplechin, starring Catherine Deneuve, Jean-Paul Roussillon, Mathieu Amalric, Anne Consigny, Melvil Poupaud, Emmanuelle Devos and Chiara Mastroianni. It tells the story of a family with strained relationships which gathers at the parents' home for Christmas, only to learn that their mother has leukemia. It was in competition for the Palme d'Or at the 2008 Cannes Film Festival.

Plot
Roubaix, December 2006. Junon Vuillard, married to Abel, is the iron-willed matriarch of the family. Junon held her family together through tough times, but her willpower made her children resentful. Junon remains handsome, and though her husband, who owns a small factory, is obese and elderly, he retains clarity, acceptance, tolerance, and unconditional love for his family. He and their mutual love holds a fragmented family together, albeit uneasily.

They have three children in their 30s.  Eldest is Elizabeth, a successful playwright and married to the equally successful Claude.  Their only child is 16-year-old Paul, mentally ill and taking powerful medication. The middle child is Henri, who drinks too much and has always fought with everyone else.  He has a new girlfriend, Faunia.  Ivan is their youngest, married to Sylvia with two sons, Basile and Baptiste.  Henri and Ivan are friends with Simon, their cousin raised with them after his parents' death. Simon works in Abel's plant, but is a part-time painter.  He is an alcoholic, frequently in trouble for public brawling.  All three men were interested in Sylvia once, but manipulated her to think that only Ivan loved her; she married and grew to love him. Junon’s other son, Joseph, is the presence around which everyone's psyches revolve: he died of leukemia when six, despite trying to save him by having another child who could be a bone marrow donor. It may be that the part of siblings' poor relationship is the mutual resentment for not saving his life.

Six years before the Christmas gathering of the film, Henri faced bankruptcy.  Elizabeth paid off his debts, but demanded that he never see her again, meaning he was excluded from family gatherings.  Family members speculate on the reason for this condition, including perhaps incest between them.

Just before Christmas, Junon learns she has acute myeloid leukemia and will soon die, unless she has a bone marrow transplant.  Her family gathers at her home and immediately start bickering. Junon asks them to donate bone marrow.  Elizabeth fights with Henri, who drinks heavily and hides Paul's medication. Paul fears the blood test might reveal his father is not his biological parent.  Henri refuses the test, because he never loved his mother.  Faunia has agreed to visit before leaving for her own family.  Her honesty and gentleness soothe Henri, and she stays for two days.

On 23 December, Rosaimée visits for dinner and fireworks. She was Abel's mother's friend, although it is suggested that they were lesbian lovers. Rosaimée tells Sylvia that Simon stopped seeing Sylvia because he believed she would be happier with Ivan. Sylvia feels betrayed and manipulated. Henri has the test and discovers he can donate. He decides to do so despite disliking his mother. Simon begins drinking heavily in cafes, and the family seeks him. Sylvia discovers him and confesses that she knows he loves her.  She and Simon spend several hours talking, then return to the house and make love.  Paul tells Henri about his fears. Henri convinces him that he is not his father, confirmed by the test, and reassures Paul that it is not a failing to be afraid.  They bond, and Paul’s mental condition improves. On Christmas Day, Abel and Elizabeth discuss Elizabeth's longstanding depression, and Abel reads her the prologue to Friedrich Nietzsche's On the Genealogy of Morality about how well we know – or don't know – ourselves. Abel suggests that Elizabeth fears death, and that has led to her caution and depression.

The film ends with Ivan discovering his wife has had sex with Simon (they make no effort to hide it, waking up together in bed and greeting her children as they come bearing tea), but the effect on him is not revealed – he seems remarkably blase, as though he has expected it.   Paul stays behind with Henri, who is having a positive effect on his mental health.  Henri donates his bone marrow to Junon, but she announces, seemingly before medical evidence for it, that her body will reject the transplant.  Elizabeth speculates that Junon will live, but Henri is shown flipping a coin in the hospital in front of his mother and not revealing the answer.

Cast

Catherine Deneuve as Junon Vuillard
Jean-Paul Roussillon as Abel
Anne Consigny as Elizabeth Dédalus
Mathieu Amalric as Henri Vuillard
Melvil Poupaud as Ivan Vuillard
Hippolyte Girardot as Claude Dédalus
Emmanuelle Devos as Faunia
Chiara Mastroianni as Sylvia Vuillard
Laurent Capelluto as Simon
Emile Berling as Paul Dédalus
Thomas Obled as Basile 'Baz' Vuillard
Clément Obled as Baptiste Vuillard
Françoise Bertin as Rosaimée Vuillard
Samir Guesmi as Spatafora 
Azize Kabouche as Doctor Zraïdi

Critical reception

Awards and nominations
Broadcast Film Critics (USA)
Nominated: Best Foreign Language Film
Cannes Film Festival (France)
Nominated: Golden Palm (Arnaud Desplechin)
César Awards (France)
Won: Best Actor – Supporting Role (Jean-Paul Roussillon)
Nominated: Best Actress – Supporting Role (Anne Consigny)
Nominated: Best Cinematography (Eric Gautier)
Nominated: Best Director (Arnaud Desplechin)
Nominated: Best Editing (Laurence Briaud)
Nominated: Best Film
Nominated: Best Sound (Nicolas Cantin, Jean-Pierre Laforce and Sylvain Malbrant)
Nominated: Best Writing – Original (Emmanuel Bourdieu and Arnaud Desplechin)
Nominated: Most Promising Actor (Laurent Capelluto)
Chicago Film Critics (USA)
Nominated: Best Foreign Language Film
Christmas Gifts (France)
Won: Best Director (Arnaud Desplechin)
Online Film Critics Society (USA)
Nominated: Best Foreign Language Film
Satellite Awards (USA)
Nominated: Best Actress – Musical or Comedy (Catherine Deneuve)

Reviews

Top ten lists
The film appeared on many critics' top ten lists of the best films of 2008.

1st — Andrew O'Hehir, Salon
1st — Dana Stevens, Slate
1st — Josh Rosenblatt, The Austin Chronicle
1st — Rick Groen, The Globe and Mail
1st — Sean Axmaker, Seattle Post-Intelligencer
1st — Shawn Levy, The Oregonian
2nd — Kenneth Turan, Los Angeles Times (tied with The Class)
2nd — Kimberly Jones, The Austin Chronicle
2nd — Stephanie Zacharek, Salon

3rd — Michael Phillips, Chicago Tribune
4th — Lou Lumenick, New York Post
5th — Ella Taylor, LA Weekly (tied with The Class)
6th — Dennis Harvey, Variety
7th — Scott Foundas, LA Weekly (tied with The Secret of the Grain)
7th — Stephen Holden, The New York Times
8th — Liam Lacey, The Globe and Mail
10th — Robert Mondello, NPR

See also
 List of Christmas films

References

External links
 
 
 
A Christmas Tale: The Inescapable Family an essay by Phillip Lopate at the Criterion Collection

2000s Christmas comedy-drama films
2008 films
2000s French-language films
Films about dysfunctional families
Films directed by Arnaud Desplechin
Films with screenplays by Arnaud Desplechin
Films featuring a Best Supporting Actor César Award-winning performance
French Christmas comedy-drama films
Films set in 2006
2000s French films